The Province of North Karelia was a province of Finland from 1960 to 1997.

It was established in 1960 when it was separated from the Province of Kuopio. In 1997 it was reunited with Kuopio and together with the Province of Mikkeli it was merged into the new Province of Eastern Finland.

Maps

|

Municipalities in 1997 (cities in bold) 

Eno
Ilomantsi
Joensuu
Juuka
Kesälahti
Kiihtelysvaara
Kitee
Kontiolahti
Outokumpu
Lieksa
Liperi
Nurmes
Polvijärvi
Pyhäselkä
Rääkkylä
Tohmajärvi
Tuupovaara
Valtimo
Värtsilä

Former municipalities (disestablished before 1997) 
 Nurmeksen mlk
 Pielisjärvi

Governors 
 Lauri Riikonen 1960–1967
 Esa Timonen 1967–1992
 Hannu Tenhiälä 1992–1997

Provinces of Finland (1917–97)
States and territories established in 1960